The Albertina is a museum in Vienna, Austria, containing the world's best collection of old master prints and drawings.

Albertina, a feminine adjectival form of Albert (given name), may also refer to:

Places
 Albertina, Minas Gerais, a town in Brazil
 Albertina, Western Cape, a town in South Africa's Western Cape province

People
 Albertina Berkenbrock (1919–1931), Brazilian Roman Catholic virgin-martyr
 Albertina Carlsson (1848–1930), Swedish zoologist
 Albertina Dias (born 1965), Portuguese runner
 Albertina Sisulu (1918-2011), South African anti-apartheid activist
 Albertina Martínez Burgos (1981-2019), Chilean photojournalist
 Albertina Walker (1929–2010), American gospel singer

Libraries
 Albertina, a nickname for the Royal Library of Belgium
 Bibliotheca Albertina, the Leipzig University Library

Schools
 University of Freiburg, Albert Ludwig University of Freiburg before the year 1820
 University of Königsberg, or Königsberg Albertus University, the former University in East Prussia

See also
Albertine (disambiguation)
Alberta (disambiguation)